Diogo Ferreira Prioste (born 26 March 2004) is a Portuguese professional footballer who plays as a midfielder for Benfica B.

Club career
Having started his career with Damaia Ginásio Clube, Prioste moved to Benfica. He signed his first professional contract in September 2020.

International career
Prioste has represented Portugal at youth international level.

Career statistics

Club

Notes

Honours
Benfica
Campeonato Nacional de Juniores: 2021–22
Under-20 Intercontinental Cup: 2022

References

2004 births
Living people
Footballers from Lisbon
Portuguese footballers
Portugal youth international footballers
Association football midfielders
Liga Portugal 2 players
S.L. Benfica B players